PRGuy is the Twitter username of the Australian political commentator Jeremy Maluta.

Twitter account
In March 2020, Maluta set up an anonymous Twitter account @PRGuy17, at the same time the COVID-19 pandemic hit Australia. The account became popular for  becoming "one of the most vociferous cheerleaders of premier Daniel Andrews’ government" supporting the COVID-19 lockdowns. The account has become controversial in Australia due to its partisan commentary.

In March 2022, legal proceedings were launched in the Federal Court of Australia against Twitter, arguing that tweets published by the account were of a defamatory nature. Justice Debra Mortimer later ordered Twitter to hand over information related to the identification of the account owner within 14 days. In June 2022, Maluta revealed his ownership of the Twitter account @PRGuy17 on a YouTube video.

References

Living people
Australian political commentators
Twitter accounts
Year of birth missing (living people)